Guaratinguetá Futebol Ltda., usually known simply as Guaratinguetá, was a Brazilian football club from Guaratinguetá, São Paulo state.

History 
On October 1, 1998, the club was founded as Guaratinguetá Esporte Clube by a group including Doctor Mário Augusto Rodrigues Nunes (nicknamed Marinho).

On November 4, 1999, the Consórcio de Guaratinguetá (Guaratinguetá Consortium) was created, to co-manage the club with C.S.R Futebol e Marketing, owned by the entrepreneur Carlos Arini and by the football players César Sampaio and Rivaldo.

On November 26, 1999, the club joined the São Paulo Football Federation, competing in the Campeonato Paulista Série B2 in the following year.

In 2002, the Consórcio de Guaratinguetá ended, and the club was owned by the entrepreneurs Odário Mardegan Durães and Elmiro Aparecido de Faria.

Since 2004, the club has been owned by the entrepreneur Sony Alberto Douer. In 2005, he and the entrepreneur Carlos Arini founded Sony Sports, a company created to manage the club. Some time later, the entrepreneurs Clementino Bolan and Gustavo Gazzolla joined Sony Sports. The club then received its current name, Guaratinguetá Futebol, after it became a limited company.

In 2006, Guaratinguetá was eliminated in the Campeonato Paulista Série A2 semifinal stage, but was second in its group, and was therefore promoted to the following year's Campeonato Paulista Série A1.

In 2007, the club competed in the Campeonato Paulista Série A1 for the first time. Guaratinguetá was defeated by São Caetano 2–0 at the Anacleto Campanella stadium in its debut in the competition.

On October 15, 2010, the club announced its move from Guaratinguetá to Americana, and their change of name to Americana Futebol.

On November 28, 2011, after more than a year in Americana, the club's administrator, Sony Sports, announced the team's return to Guaratinguetá to compete in the 2012 Campeonato Paulista and other competitions, as Americana city and its main stadium, Estádio Décio Vitta was not able to support the club and the city's club, Rio Branco, and also because most of the supports of the club live in Guaratinguetá.

Club colors 
The club colors were red and white. The home kit is all red and the away kit is all white.

Stadium 

Guaratinguetá's home stadium was Estádio Municipal Professor Dario Rodrigues Leite, nicknamed Ninho da Garça, meaning Heron's Nest, with a maximum capacity of 15,769 people.

The club also trained at a training ground named Centro de Treinamento Dario Rodrigues Leite.

Anthem 
Americana's anthem authors were Cláudio Braga and Marcelo Betti.

Mascot 
The club's mascot was a heron. The animal was also depicted in the club's logo.

Achievements 

 Campeonato Paulista do Interior:
 Winners (1): 2007

References 

 
Association football clubs established in 1998
Football clubs in São Paulo (state)
Defunct football clubs in São Paulo (state)
1998 establishments in Brazil